The 22nd Quebec Cinema Awards were presented on 10 June 2020, to recognize talent and achievement in the cinema of Quebec. The planned 7 June ceremony was cancelled due to the COVID-19 pandemic, but nominees were announced 23 April. Abenaki documentary filmmaker Alanis Obomsawin was also selected as the recipient of the Iris Tribute at the unanimous recommendation of Québec Cinéma's Comité de représentation professionnelle.

Following the ceremony's cancellation, Québec Cinéma announced that on 10 June, most winners would be announced by webcast by Radio-Canada and ARTV, with the webcast hosted by Élise Guilbault, Guillaume Lambert and Mani Soleymanlou; following this, Jean-Philippe Wauthier hosted his show Bonsoir Bonsoir! where the winners for Best Film, Best Actor, Best Actress and the Public Prize were announced. Antigone by Sophie Deraspe won Best Film.

Although the awards were ordinated as the 22nd Quebec Cinema Awards at the time of presentation, due to their presentation as a livestream rather than a traditional award ceremony Québec Cinéma opted to also enumerate its 2021 ceremony as the 22nd Quebec Cinema Awards instead of the 23rd; however, the awards in 2022 were numbered as the 24th Quebec Cinema Awards instead of the 23rd, indicating that the 2021 awards are now considered the 23rd Quebec Cinema Awards.

Nominees and winners
Nominees and winners are:

References

Quebec Cinema
2019 in Canadian cinema
2020 in Quebec
Quebec Cinema
22
2019 awards in Canada